Prasophyllum gracile, commonly known as the little laughing leek orchid, is a species of orchid endemic to the south-west of Western Australia. It is one of the most common and widespread orchids in the south-west and has a single smooth, tube-shaped leaf and up to forty or more, usually yellowish-green flowers.

Description
Flowering occurs from July to November.

Taxonomy and naming
Prasophyllum gracile was first formally described in 1840 by John Lindley and the description was published in A Sketch of the Vegetation of the Swan River Colony. The specific epithet (gracile) is a Latin word meaning "slender" referring to the thin tips on the lateral sepals.

The taxonomy of this species has been difficult. Prasophyllum macrostachyum was described in 1810 by Robert Brown and in 1971, Alex George reduced P. gracile to a synonym of P. macrostachyum var. macrostachyum. Mark Clements examined the type specimens of P. gracile in the herbaria at Kew Gardens and determined that P. gracile is conspecific with P. ringens which had been raised to species status by Robert John Bates in 1989 and that it is different from P. macrostachyum, especially with regard to the length of the tips of the lateral sepals. Examination of fresh specimens by Clements and David Jones confirmed that  view.  As a consequence, they recognise both P. macrostachyum and P. gracile.

Distribution and habitat
The little laughing leek orchid most often grows in shallow soil pockets on granite outcrops but is also found in other habitats. It occurs from Shark Bay in the north to Eyre on the Great Australian Bight.

Conservation
This orchid is classified as "not threatened" by the Western Australian Government Department of Parks and Wildlife.

References

External links 
 
 

gracile
Endemic flora of Western Australia
Endemic orchids of Australia
Plants described in 1840